LITE Regal International School is a group of British independent colleges and summer schools, with branches in London and Cambridge, offering EFL(English as a Foreign Language) at all levels, GCSE and A-Level courses.

History
The school was formed in its current structure in 1993 by Milan Lebloch. It opened in September 1993 with a mission to give a creative education with unrivalled pastoral care, inclusivity and breadth of experience for its pupils. The school teaches in small groups (fewer than 8 students per class) to provide individual attention to the students. LRIS also offers Easter Revision courses for GCSE, AS and A level students from other schools.

Accreditation
LRIS London is a member of the British Accreditation Council (BAC) and is inspected by the Independent Schools Inspectorate (ISI).

Curriculum
The majority of students take A level courses. A small cohort each year take GCSE/IGCSE courses. The specialist preparation course is also available to the LRIS students applying to the Russel Group Universities and to competitive degree specialisms. One-year university foundation programmes for students in engineering, law, business, computers, mathematics and science stream.

Locations
The school is located at Berkeley Square in Berkeley Square House in London. The other branch is located at Bridge Street in Cambridge.

References

Educational institutions established in 1993
Education in the City of London
1993 establishments in England
Summer schools
Language schools in the United Kingdom